is the capital city of Gunma Prefecture, in the northern Kantō region of Japan. , the city had an estimated population of 335,352 in 151,171 households, and a population density of 1100 persons per km2. It was the most populous city within Gunma Prefecture until Takasaki merged with nearby towns between 2006 and 2009. Maebashi is known to be the "City of Water, Greenery and Poets" because of its pure waters, its rich nature and because it gave birth to several Japanese contemporary poets, such as Sakutarō Hagiwara.

Etymology 
The Maebashi area was called Umayabashi during the Nara period. This name finds its origins in the fact that there was a bridge crossing the Tone River and not far from the bridge there was a small refreshment house with a stable, often used by people travelling on the Tōzan-dō (the road connecting the capital to the eastern regions of Japan). The spelling was officially changed into Maebashi in 1649 during the Edo period when Maebashi became a castle town and the center of Maebashi Domain, a feudal domain under the Tokugawa shogunate.

History
The town of Maebashi was established within Higashigunma District, Gunma Prefecture on April 1, 1889, with the creation of the modern municipalities system after the Meiji Restoration. Maebashi was raised to city status on April 1, 1892. In 1901, it annexed a portion of Kamikawabuchi village from Seta District.

On August 5, 1945, approximately 64.2% of the urban core of the city was destroyed during World War II during air raids which followed the dropping of propaganda leaflets warning of the impending attacks.

In 1951, a portion of Kaigaya Village from Seta District was merged into Maebashi. The city expanded further on April 1, 1954, by annexing the villages of Kamikawabuchi, Shimokawabuchi, Azuma, Minamitachibana, Kaigaya, Haga, Motosōja, and Sōja from Seta District, followed by a portion of Jōnan village in 1957. On April 1, 1960, a portion of Tamamura Town and another portion of Jōnan village were merged into Maebashi, which finally annexed the remainder of Jōnan village in 1967.

Maebashi hosted the 1999 IAAF World Indoor Championships.

On April 1, 2001, Maebashi was designated a special city (tokureishi) with increased local autonomy.

On December 5, 2004, the town of Ōgo, as well as the villages of Kasukawa and Miyagi (all from Seta District), were merged into Maebashi. On May 5, 2009, the village of Fujimi (Seta District) was merged into Maebashi. Seta District was dissolved as a result of this merger.

Maebashi became a core city (Chūkakushi) on April 1, 2009.

Geography
Maebashi is located at the foot of Mount Akagi in the northeast corner of the Kantō Plain. It is also surrounded by Mount Haruna and Mount Myōgi. Two rivers run through the city: the Tone River, Japan's second-longest, and the Hirose River. Although it is located inland more than 100 kilometers away from the coast, the elevation of the southern part of the city is only around 100 meters. The highest elevation is 1823 meters above sea level on the south side of Mt. Kurohino, a peak of Mount Akagi. Maebashi is the farthest from the sea (about 120 km) of all Japanese prefectural capitals. The surrounding cities comprise an urban zone of over 1 million people, separated by farmland to the south from the built up areas of Greater Tokyo.

Surrounding municipalities
Gunma Prefecture
 Isesaki
 Kiryū
 Numata
 Shibukawa
 Takasaki
 Shintō
 Tamamura
 Yoshioka

Climate
Maebashi has a humid subtropical climate (Köppen climate classification Cfa). In the winter, the karakkaze, or "dry wind" blows through Maebashi from the north. This is due to the snow clouds coming from the Sea of Japan being blocked by the Echigo Mountain Range between Gunma and Niigata Prefectures. Because of this, the city has a dry winter and is one of the sunniest places in Japan at over 2,210 hours of sunshine per year. In the summer, it is hot since the location is inland, although less hot than coastal Tokyo on average. On July 24, 2001, Maebashi hit , the fifth-hottest temperature ever in Japan.

Demographics

Per Japanese census data, the population of Maebashi has recently plateaued after a long period of growth.

Government
Maebashi has a mayor-council form of government with a directly elected mayor and a unicameral city council of 38 members. Maebashi contributes eight members to the Gunma Prefectural Assembly. In terms of national politics, the city is part of Gunma 1st district of the lower house of the Diet of Japan.

Economy

As of 2010, Greater Maebashi, Maebashi Metropolitan Employment Area, has a GDP of US$59.8 billion. The air conditioning system and compressor manufacturing company Sanden Corporation as well as the tofu and tofu products company Sagamiya Foods have manufacturing sites in the city. The Gunma Bank is headquartered in Maebashi.

Education

Universities
 Gunma Prefectural College of Health Sciences
 Gunma University
 Gunma University of Health and Welfare
 Maebashi Institute of Technology
 Maebashi Kyoai Gakuen College

Primary and secondary schools
Maebashi has 54 public elementary schools and 21 public middle schools operated by the city government, and two private elementary and two private middle schools. The city has nine public high schools operated by the Gunma Prefectural Board of Education and one by the city government. There are five private high schools and one private combined middle/high school.

International schools:

  – North Korean school

Transportation

Railway
 JR East – Jōetsu Line
  - 
 JR East – Ryōmō Line
  -  -  - 
 Jōmō Electric Railway Company – Jōmō Line
  -  -  -  -  -  -  -  -  -  -  -  -  -

Highway
  – Maebashi Interchange
  – Maebashi-Minami Interchange

Sports
Thespakusatsu Gunma at Shoda Shoyu Stadium Gunma was originally formed in Kusatsu, but plays in Maebashi due to J.League stadium requirements.

Local attractions
 Gunma Prefectural Government Building
 Kōzuke Kokubun-ji ruins, a National Historic Site
 Maebashi Castle
 Maebashi Tōshō-gū
 Shikishima Park

Festivals
 Ogo Gion Festival

Noted people from Maebashi

 Tōru Furusawa, voice actor
 Great-O-Khan, Japanese professional wrestler (Real Name: Tomoyuki Oka, Nihongo: 岡 倫之, Oka Tomoyuki)
 Sakutarō Hagiwara, poet
 Gran Hamada, Japanese professional wrestler (Real Name: Hiroaki Hamada, Nihongo: 浜田 広秋, Hamada Hiroaki)
 Hajime Hosogai, professional football player
 Shigesato Itoi, game designer
 Nobuyuki Kojima, professional soccer player
 Nigo (real came: Tomoaki Nagao, Nihongo: 長尾 智明, Nagao Tomoaki), fashion designer, DJ, record producer, and entrepreneur
 Kamiizumi Nobutsuna, founder of Shinkage-ryū martial arts school and master of Yagyū Munetoshi, who later introduced Shinkage-ryū to Tokugawa Ieyasu.
 Kōhei Oguri, film director and screenwriter
 Tetsuya Ota, race car driver
 Sho Sakurai, singer, actor and newscaster
 Genichiro Sata, politician
 Takashi Shimizu, film director and creator of the Ju-On franchise.
 Atsuko Tanaka, voice actress
 Yutaka Yoshie, professional wrestler

Twin towns – sister cities

Maebashi is twinned with:
 Birmingham, Alabama, United States

In addition, Maebashi cooperates with Menasha, Wisconsin, United States.

In popular culture
Pewter City from Japanese game series Pokémon was geographically placed in the city of Maebashi.

References

External links

 Official Website 
 Maebashi Living Guide

 
Cities in Gunma Prefecture